This is a list of singles that have spent time in the top ten of the Billboard Hot 100 during 1960, presented chronologically from the year's first top-ten list from the issue dated January 4, 1960, to each song's entry date through the final published issue of the year.

Connie Francis scored five top ten hits during the year with "Mama", "Everybody's Somebody's Fool", "My Heart Has a Mind of Its Own", "Many Tears Ago", and "Among My Souvenirs", the most among all other artists.

Top-ten singles

1959 peaks

1961 peaks

See also
 1960 in music
 List of Hot 100 number-one singles of 1960 (U.S.)
 Billboard Year-End Hot 100 singles of 1960

References

General sources

 Whitburn, Joel. The Billboard Pop Charts, 1955–1959
Joel Whitburn Presents the Billboard Hot 100 Charts: The Sixties
Additional information obtained can be verified within Billboard's online business archive services and print editions of the magazine.

1960
United States Hot 100 Top 10